Subjective vitality refers to a positive feeling of aliveness and energy. It is often used instead of measures of subjective well-being in studies of eudaimonia and psychological well-being. It is also a better predictor of physical health when assessed by a doctor than subjective well-being.

See also
Aristotle
Eudaimonia
Flourishing
Happiness
Positive psychology
Subjective well-being

References

Well-being